Martin H. Dubilier (1926–1991) was an American businessman and an inventor, a co-founder of Clayton, Dubilier & Rice and the son of William Dubilier. He invented a rust-resistant train track at the age of 12 and low voltage flash bulbs eliminating the need for battery packs – at age 18.
Dubilier graduated from Princeton University in 1950 and from Harvard Business School with an MBA in 1952.

References 

1926 births
1991 deaths
Princeton University alumni
Harvard Business School alumni
20th-century American businesspeople
20th-century American inventors